The Diocese of Kootenay is a diocese of the Ecclesiastical Province of British Columbia and the Yukon of the Anglican Church of Canada.

The diocese was created by a decision of the Synod of the Diocese of New Westminster in November 1899 to divide that diocese into two along the 120 degrees line of longitude. The new Diocese of Kootenay would comprise the area of the original diocese eastward of that line to the Alberta border. In 1900 the Synod of the new Diocese met in Nelson and selected St. Saviour's Church there as its cathedral. After being provisionally administered by New Westminster for several years, the Diocese of Kootenay got its first bishop, Alexander Doull, in 1914.

In 1987 the cathedral was re-established at its present location at St. Michael and All Angels' Church in the City of Kelowna, where the bishops had actually lived since 1955.

Bishops of Kootenay

Deans of Kootenay
Since 1987, the Dean of Kootenay has also been the incumbent at St Michael and All Angel's Cathedral, Kelowna.

1945–1948: Patrick Clark (Bishop of Kootenay, 1948)
1948–1956: Thomas L. Leadbeater 
1957–1963: G.W. Lang
1973–1980: Alan Jackson
1987–2000: Jack Greenhalgh 
2001–2009: Allan R. Reed 
2009–2020: Nissa Basbaum 
2021–present: David Tiessen

References

External links
 Diocese of Kootenay website

Kootenay, Anglican Diocese of
Anglican Province of British Columbia and Yukon